Jean Chrétien Ferdinand Hoefer (German: Ferdinand Höfer, 21 April 1811, Döschnitz – 4 May 1878) was a German-French physician and lexicographer. He is now known for his many works on the history of science.

Selected works

Éléments de chimie générale (1841)
Histoire de la chimie: Volume 1, Volume 2 (1842–43)
Dictionnaire de chimie et de physique (1846)
Dictionnaire de médecine pratique (1847)
Afrique australe ... Afrique orientale ... Afrique centrale ... Empire de Maroc (Paris, Firmin Didot frères, 1848)
Dictionnaire de botanique (1850) 
Le Maroc et la Chaldée (1848)
Chaldée, Assyrie, Médie, Babylonie, Mésopotamie, Phénicie, Palmyrène (Firmin Didot frères, 1852).
Bibliothèque historique de Diodore de Sicile (L. Hachette, 1865). Work by Diodorus Siculus, trans. Hoefer. 
 
Le monde des bois (1867)
Les saisons (1867-1869)
L'homme devant ses œuvres (1872)
Histoire de la physique et de la chimie (Paris Hachette, 1872)
Histoire de l'astronomie (Paris: Hachette, 1873)
Histoire de la zoologie (1873)
Histoire des mathématiques (1874)
Histoire de la botanique, de la minéralogie et de la géologie (Paris, Hachette et cie, 1882).

He also compiled the 46-volume "Nouvelle Biographie Générale, depuis les temps les plus reculés jusqu'à nos jours" (New General Biography, from earliest times to the present day), from 1853 to 1866.

References

F. Hoefer (Ed.). Nouvelle Biographie Générale, Volume 24 pp. 845-854.

External links
  Critical discussion of the Histoire de la chimie (Michel Eugène Chevreul)

Physicians from Thuringia
1811 births
1878 deaths
Historians of science
French science writers
French lexicographers
People from Schwarzburg-Rudolstadt
French male non-fiction writers
German writers in French
19th-century French historians
Chevaliers of the Légion d'honneur
19th-century French male writers
19th-century lexicographers